Ireland in the Middle Ages may refer to:

History of Ireland (400–800), Ireland in the early Middle Ages
History of Ireland (800–1169), Ireland in the high Middle Ages
History of Ireland (1169–1536), Ireland in the late Middle Ages

See also
History of Ireland
Early Modern Ireland
Gaelic Ireland

External links